Bucklandiella elegans is a species of moss in the family Grimmiaceae. It is found in New Zealand.

References

External links
 Bucklandiella elegans at Atlas of Living Australia

Plants described in 2010
Grimmiales
Flora of New Zealand